Rapla KK, also known as Avis Utilitas Rapla for sponsorship reasons, is a professional basketball club based in Rapla, Estonia. The team plays in the Latvian–Estonian Basketball League. Their home arena is the Sadolin Sports Hall.

History 
In 1996, Korvpalliklubi Rapla (Basketball Club Rapla) was founded as a division of the Rapla Sports School. Rapla Korvpallikool (Rapla Basketball School) was formed in 2004.

In 2010, Rapla moved to the new Sadolin Sports Hall and were promoted to the top-tier Korvpalli Meistriliiga (KML). Coached by Indrek Ruut, they finished the 2010–11 regular season in sixth place and reached the playoffs, where they were eliminated in the quarterfinals by TTÜ/Kalev, losing the series 1 game to 3. In 2011, Rapla joined the Challenge Cup competition of the regional Baltic Basketball League (BBL) for the 2011–12 season, but failed to advance past the group stage. In 2012, Rapla reached the Estonian Cup final, but lost to Rakvere Tarvas 64–81.

In 2014, Aivar Kuusmaa was hired as head coach. The team finished the 2014–15 regular season in third place. In the 2015 KML Playoffs, Rapla defeated Valga in the quarterfinals, but lost to Kalev and finished third after beating Rakvere Tarvas 2 games to 1 in the third place games. Rapla finished third again in the 2015–16. The team finished the 2016–17 regular season in third place with Thomas van der Mars being named Most Valuable Player (MVP). In the 2017 KML Playoffs, Rapla defeated Valga 3 games to 0 in the quarterfinals and University of Tartu 3 games to 1 in the semifinals, reaching the finals for the first time in their history, but lost the series to Kalev 0 games to 4.

Sponsorship naming 
The team has had several denominations through the years due to its sponsorship:
 Piimameister Otto/Rapla: 2010–2012
 TYCO Rapla: 2012–2015
 AVIS Rapla: 2015–2017
 AVIS UTILITAS Rapla: 2017–present

Home arenas 
 Alu Sports Hall (2009–2010)
 Sadolin Sports Hall (2010–present)

Players

Current roster

Depth chart

Coaches

 Indrek Ruut 2010–2014
 Aivar Kuusmaa 2014–2018
 Toomas Annuk 2019–2021

 Lluís Riera 2021–2022
 Arnel Dedic 2022–present

Season by season

Trophies and awards

Trophies 
Estonian Championship
 Runners-up (1): 2016–17

Estonian Cup
 Runners-up (1): 2012

Individual awards 

KML MVP
 Thomas van der Mars – 2017

KML Best Defender
 Martin Dorbek – 2013

KML Best Young Player
 Rait-Riivo Laane – 2012, 2013

KML Coach of the Year
 Aivar Kuusmaa – 2017

All-KML Team
 Indrek Kajupank – 2016, 2017
 Heigo Erm – 2011
 Janar Soo – 2012
 Domagoj Bubalo – 2015
 Martin Paasoja – 2017
 Thomas van der Mars – 2017
 Dominique Hawkins – 2018
 Roberts Freimanis – 2021

Notes

References

External links 
  

Basketball teams in Estonia
Basketball teams established in 2004
2004 establishments in Estonia
Rapla
Korvpalli Meistriliiga